Breast Men is a 1997 American, semibiographical, dark drama film; it was written by John Stockwell and directed by Lawrence O'Neil for HBO.

Plot 
Dr. Kevin Saunders (played by David Schwimmer) and Dr. William Larson (played by Chris Cooper) pioneer the usage of silicone breast implants. Larson comes up with the idea of the breast implant. Saunders tries to dissuade them, but eventually comes around. Saunders and Larson gain immense financial success as cosmetic breast augmentation surgeries rise in acceptance and frequency in American culture, but follow different life paths thereafter: Dr. Saunders becoming a narcissist interested in developing and implanting the exaggeratedly larger-sized types of implants popular with a mostly erotic dancer and female porn star clientele. Doctor Larson, Saunders' former mentor and business partner, is portrayed as continuing to pursue a more serious, clinical approach (e.g., reconstructive breast surgeries for female breast cancer survivors, etc.). Complications arise with the implants and the doctors are sued, leading to their fall from grace. Larson dies in his home of a heart attack and Saunders' Corvette crashes into a mack truck, killing him.

Historical accuracy 
The film very loosely tracks the history of the real-life breast implant phenomenon, from its radical introduction through its incredible popularity, through the controversial link of its silicone base to various types of illnesses and cancers (culminating in the Food and Drug Administration's moratorium on use of silicone in breast implants, leading the industry to use saline implants, instead). The story is interspersed with interview snippets of women from the 1970s who underwent breast augmentations with varying degrees of success, including their likes and dislikes about them. The interviews are marked by the fact that they show only the interviewees' nude breasts and torso.

In reality, silicone implants were developed by Texas-based plastic surgeons Drs. Frank Gerow and Thomas Cronin.

Production 
Much of the filming was done in Galveston, Texas, and includes numerous interior and exterior shots of historic Star Drug, a drug store and soda fountain with a distinctive vintage ceramic Coca-Cola sign displayed over its front door. Star Drug burned in 1998 but has since been rebuilt. Limited footage is shown, as well, of the University of Texas Medical Branch campus.

Cast 
 David Schwimmer as Dr. Kevin Saunders
 Chris Cooper as Dr. William Larson
 Emily Procter as Laura Pierson
 Matt Frewer as Gerald Krzemien
 Terry O'Quinn as Hersch Lawyer
 Kathleen Wilhoite as Timmie Jean Lindsey
 John Stockwell as Robert Renaud
 Lisa Marie as Vanessa
 Louise Fletcher as Mrs. Saunders
 Michael Cavanaugh as Harry
 Michael Chieffo as Dave
 Leigh-Allyn Baker as Implant Removal Patient
 Fred Willard as Talk Show Host
 Lyle Lovett as Research Scientist
 Rena Riffel as Swimming Pool Girl
 Tim Payovich as David Schwimmer's Buttocks

Reception 
The film was released to mixed reviews.

References

External links 
 
 
 

1997 television films
1997 films
1997 comedy-drama films
HBO Films films
Galveston, Texas
1990s English-language films
Films scored by Dennis McCarthy
Films shot in Houston
Films produced by Gary Lucchesi
Medical-themed films
American comedy-drama television films
1990s American films